The 1995 Rhythmic Gymnastics European Championships is the 11th edition of the Rhythmic Gymnastics European Championships, which took place from 6 July to 9 July 1995 in Prague, Czech Republic.

Medal winners

Medal table

References 

1995 in gymnastics
Rhythmic Gymnastics European Championships